Estádio do Lumiar was a multi-use stadium in Lisbon, Portugal. It was initially used as the stadium of Sporting Clube de Portugal matches.  It was replaced by the Estádio José Alvalade in 1956.  The capacity of the stadium was 35,000 spectators.

Portugal national football team

The following national team matches were held in the stadium.

External links
 Stadium information

Lumiar
Sporting CP